Control software may refer to:

Content-control software, which restricts the content a reader is authorised to access
Remote desktop software, which allows a computer's desktop environment to be controlled remotely
Version control software, which manages changes to documents, code, and other collections of information
Remote monitoring and control, in various settings
Industrial control systems such as SCADA, which implement control systems in industrial settings

See also
Control panel (software), which allows control of software and hardware features